This is a list of places in Victoria, Australia which retain the names of pastoral leases or runs which were granted from the late 1830s.

Introduction
The major reference for the leases is from 1866 when they were established throughout Victoria, and while many had been subdivided the original name was still extant. Eighteen pastoral districts existed at that time, the Settled Districts being generally a coastal strip from suburban Melbourne west to Portland where farming development was encouraged and Colony services were provided. The Swan Hill district included most of what is now The Mallee.

Leases bearing names of geographical features are mainly excluded as the name usually preceded the establishment of the run, for instance Mount Eccles or Fitzroy River.

Many localities listed are named from the parish in which they exist, the parish having been surveyed and gazetted later than the pastoral run and named from the run.County and Parish lists, Victoria 1910

Localities are bounded areas as recognised by the Victorian Registrar of Geographic Names acting under the  Geographic Place Names Act (1998), although boundaries are the responsibility of each council. Detailed maps showing locality boundaries within a Local Government Area (LGA) are available on the State Government Victoria's, Department of Environment and Primary Industries (DEPI), Land and Survey Spatial Information (LASSI) interactive map website.

Placenames followed by an asterisk are unbounded areas within localities, defined as neighbourhoods.

The list

See also
List of localities in Victoria (Australia)
History of Victoria

References

Victoria
Victoria
Places named from pastoral runs